The Boisavia B.60 Mercurey was a series of four-seat light aircraft developed in France shortly after World War II.

Design and operations

The Mercurey was a conventional high-wing braced monoplane with fixed tailwheel undercarriage. It was built in small numbers and found use in the normal general aviation roles of tourer, trainer, agricultural aircraft, and glider tug.

Variants
B.60 Mercurey3 prototypes powered by  Renault 4Pei engine
B.601 MercureyPowered by a  Avco Lycoming O-435-1 engine;three built.
B.601L MercureyMain production version, equipped with an  Avco Lycoming O-360-A engine;twenty-seven built.
B.602 MercureyPowered by a  Continental E165-4 engine;two built.
B.602A1x  Continental O-470-11
B.603 Mercurey SpecialGlider tug version, powered by a  Salmson 8 As engine (Argus As 10);five built.
B.604 Mercurey IIDedicated glider tug with lengthened fuselage, powered by a  Salmson 9ABc radial piston engine;one built).
B.605 MercureySimilar to the B.60, powered by a  Régnier 4LO2 (SNECMA 4L-02) engine;four built.
B.606 Mercurey Régnier 4LO20 (SNECMA 4L-00) engine;one built.

Specifications (B.60)

References

Further reading

 
 
 
 
 

Mercurey
1940s French civil utility aircraft
Single-engined tractor aircraft
High-wing aircraft
Aircraft first flown in 1949